Several people or things bear the name Aeschylus:

Aeschylus (с. 525/524-c. 456/455 BC), Athenian playwright of the 5th century BC, best known for the Oresteia trilogy
Aeschylus of Athens, King of Athens from 778 to 755 BC
Aeschylus of Alexandria, epic poet in the 2nd century
Aeschylus of Cnidus, contemporary of Cicero, and one of the most celebrated rhetoricians in Asia Minor
Aeschylus of Rhodes, governor of that city after its conquest by Alexander the Great
2876 Aeschylus, asteroid named after the playwright

See also
Escalus